Elachista saccharella, the sugarcane leafminer moth, is a moth of the family Elachistidae. It is found in Florida, and  Louisiana in the United States and in Cuba.

The larvae feed on Saccharum species. They mine the leaves of their host plant.

References

saccharella
Moths described in 1933
Moths of North America